George Kambosos Jr vs Devin Haney, billed as Undisputed, was a lightweight unification professional boxing match contested between WBA (Super), IBF, WBO, and The Ring champion, George Kambosos Jr, and WBC champion, Devin Haney. The bout took place on 5 June 2022, at Marvel Stadium in Melbourne, Australia, with the winner set to become the first undisputed lightweight champion since Pernell Whitaker in 1990, and the first in the four-belt era.

Background 
After defeating Vasiliy Lomachenko in October 2020, Teófimo López claimed to have become the undisputed champion in the lightweight division. However, many boxing purists rejected López's claim, believing Devin Haney had the legitimate WBC lightweight title, meaning that there was still not an undisputed lightweight champion. Haney called out López for a bout to end the debate, which did not materialise. Haney was set to be ordered to face fellow American lightweight Ryan Garcia, which Garcia dismissed, instead advocating for a bout with Gervonta Davis. Haney then agreed to a title defence against Jorge Linares, winning by unanimous decision.

Meanwhile, López was forced to a mandatory defence against Australian George Kambosos Jr, which was originally set for 5 June in Miami, Florida, before being moved to 19 June. López then tested positive for COVID-19, and after multiple setbacks, the fight was finally set for 27 November in New York City, New York. In one of the biggest upsets of 2021, Kambosos Jr defeated López via split decision, winning the unified lightweight titles in the process.

On 15 October, Ryan Garcia was forced to pull out of his bout with Joseph Diaz, and Devin Haney agreed to step in and face Diaz on 5 December in Las Vegas, Nevada, with Haney winning by unanimous decision. Haney then called out Kambosos Jr, who had defeated López the week before, to determine an undisputed lightweight champion. However, there was another man in the lightweight division looking for Kambosos Jr's titles: Vasiliy Lomachenko, who defeated Richard Commey on 11 December in New York. A potential bout with Lomachenko seemed more likely for Kambosos Jr, as a two-fight deal was agreed without any problems on 15 February 2022. However, on 24 February, Russia invaded Lomachenko's country of Ukraine, with Lomachenko heading over to Ukraine in order to defend his country, as well as unified heavyweight champion and fellow Ukrainian, Oleksandr Usyk. On 20 March, Lomachenko was given permission to leave Ukraine in order to start training for a potential bout with Kambosos Jr. However, Lomachenko declined, opting to stay and fight for his country. This resulted in Kambosos Jr–Haney talks advancing, and on 27 March, the pair struck a deal, which included Haney signing a two-fight deal with Top Rank and Lou DiBella to fight exclusively on ESPN platforms. The deal includes a rematch clause if Haney wins, with the rematch also taking place in Australia. Even if Haney loses, his next bout afterward would be co-promoted by Top Rank and DiBella.

Fight card

See also

Boxing in Australia
Sport in Melbourne

References

2022 in Australian sport
2022 in boxing
Boxing in Australia
Sports competitions in Melbourne
June 2022 sports events in Australia
2020s in Melbourne
Boxing matches